CIGV-FM is a Canadian radio station, which broadcasts at 100.7 FM in Penticton, British Columbia, with rebroadcasters in Keremeos and Princeton. Founded by The Robinson Family of Great Valleys Radio in 1981,  the station was sold to Newcap Radio in 2011, and approved by the CRTC on February 15, 2012. CIGV is the only country format station in the Okanagan Valley and was rebranded to Country 100.7 on April 27, 2012. On May 14, 2012, at 5:30 a.m., 'Okanagan Mornings with Troy Scott and Roo Phelps' went on the air. Troy Scott was released from the company in August 2012 and became Program Director of CJSU-FM. 100.7 re-branded the morning show as "Okanagan Mornings with Roo Phelps." Scott George hosts Okanagan Afternoons.

In February 2017, CIGV-FM rebranded to New Country 100.7.

Rebroadcasters
CIGV-FM-1 98.9 FM - Keremeos
CIGV-FM-2 98.1 FM - Princeton

External links
 New Country 100.7
 
 

Igv
Igv
Igv
Radio stations established in 1981
1981 establishments in British Columbia